Thermal decomposition (or thermolysis) is a chemical decomposition caused by heat. The decomposition temperature of a substance is the temperature at which the substance chemically decomposes. The reaction is usually endothermic as heat is required to break chemical bonds in the compound undergoing decomposition. If decomposition is sufficiently exothermic, a positive feedback loop is created producing thermal runaway and possibly an explosion or other chemical reaction.

Decomposition temperature definition

A simple substance (like water) may exist in equilibrium with its thermal decomposition products, effectively halting the decomposition. The equilibrium fraction of decomposed molecules increases with the temperature.

Examples
Calcium carbonate (limestone or chalk) decomposes into calcium oxide and carbon dioxide when heated. The chemical reaction is as follows:
CaCO3 → CaO + CO2
The reaction is used to make quick lime, which is an industrially important product.
Another example of thermal decomposition is 2Pb(NO3)2 → 2PbO + O2 + 4NO2.
Some oxides, especially of weakly electropositive metals decompose when heated to high enough temperature. A classical example is the decomposition of mercuric oxide to give oxygen and mercury metal. The reaction was used by Joseph Priestley to prepare samples of gaseous oxygen for the first time.
When water is heated to well over 2000 °C, a small percentage of it will decompose into OH, monatomic oxygen, monatomic hydrogen, O2, and H2.
The compound with the highest known decomposition temperature is carbon monoxide at ≈3870 °C (≈7000 °F).

Decomposition of nitrates, nitrites and ammonium compounds
 Ammonium dichromate on heating yields nitrogen, water and chromium(III) oxide.
 Ammonium nitrate on strong heating yields dinitrogen oxide ("laughing gas") and water.
 Ammonium nitrite on heating yields nitrogen gas and water.
 Barium azide on heating yields barium metal and nitrogen gas.
 Sodium azide on heating at 300 °C violently decomposes to nitrogen and metallic sodium.
 Sodium nitrate on heating yields sodium nitrite and oxygen gas.
 Organic compounds like tertiary amines on heating undergo Hofmann elimination and yield secondary amines and alkenes.

Ease of decomposition
When metals are near the bottom of the reactivity series, their compounds generally decompose easily at high temperatures. This is because stronger bonds form between atoms towards the top of the reactivity series, and strong bonds are difficult to break. For example, copper is near the bottom of the reactivity series, and copper sulfate (CuSO4), begins to decompose at about 200 °C, increasing rapidly at higher temperatures to about 560 °C. In contrast potassium is near the top of the reactivity series, and potassium sulfate (K2SO4) does not decompose at its melting point of about 1069 °C, nor even at its boiling point.

Practical applications 
There are many scenarios in the real world that are affected by thermal degradation. One of the things affected is fingerprints. When anyone touches something, there is residue left from the fingers. If fingers are sweaty, or contain more oils, the residue contains many chemicals. De Paoli and her collogues conducted a study testing thermal degradation on certain components found in fingerprints. For heat exposure, the amino acid and urea samples started degradation at 100°C and for lactic acid, the decomposition process started around 50°C. These components are necessary for further testing, so in the forensics discipline, decomposition of fingerprints is significant.

See also 
Thermal degradation of polymers
Ellingham diagram
Thermochemical cycle
Thermal depolymerization
Chemical thermodynamics
Pyrolysis - thermal decomposition of organic material
Gas generator

References 

Chemical reactions
Thermodynamics